Worldreader is a 501(c)(3) global nonprofit organization working with partners to get children reading at least 25 books a year with understanding. 

Since 2010, Worldreader has supported more than 21 million readers in over 100 countries. Worldreader's BookSmart experience provides children the tools they need to build their reading skills through high-quality books, activities that reinforce reading in fun and interactive ways, and where they are celebrated for their reading success. 

The organization has headquarters in San Francisco, California, and Barcelona, Spain, and  programmatic operations in India, Kenya, Ghana, Peru and the United States.

Approach for Impact
Worldreader works with families, caregivers, and their children on a digital reading journey that improves children’s reading comprehension, emotional intelligence, and digital literacy skills. Worldreader supports the reading of children ages 3-12, utilizing its ABCDE approach.  

 Apps. BookSmart, available on Android, iOS, and KaiOS, works across digital devices including smartphones, feature phones, tablets, computers, and Chromebooks. BookSmart app, available on Google's Play Store and Apple App Store. has also been widely distributed on MTN, Reliance Jio, Moya and other mobile operators.

 Books. Thousands of digital books from around the world in multiple languages (Arabic, English, Hindi, Kiswahili and Spanish).
 Capacity building. Training for caregivers, educators, and reading champions within the community so they feel confident about reading to and with children.
 Data. Collect real-time reading data and share it with caregivers/partners to continuously help them get more children reading.
 Engagement. Behavior change strategies deployed to create a new culture of reading in the home and beyond.

Governance

Worldreader is organized as a 501(c)(3) charitable organization in the United States, and has received a Guidestar Transparency Seal. Its U.S. Board of Directors consists of: David Risher (president), Peter Spiro, Charles Brighton, Chris Capossela (chair), Elizabeth Khuri Chandler, Elizabeth Dollar, Prasanna Krishnan, Kate James, Ericka Lock, Gretchen Sorensen, Kartik Raghavan, Dana Reid, and Alison Rich. In Spain, the organization operates as a registered non-profit foundation validated by the Ministry of Education with the registration number 1361.
 
CEO David Risher leads the organization from San Francisco, California. A mix of private social investors, corporate sponsors, and government agencies including USAID, GPE, EdTech Hub, funds the organization.

Research Studies 
Worldreader's research spans the spectrum of implementation science to outcome assessments.  Worldreader, in collaboration with Open University in the UK, introduced an implementation science approach and the use of PLAN, STUDY, DO, and ACT (PDSA) cycles to test creative solutions towards improving reading outcomes in children in Kenya in 2022. In India, 8,000 caregivers and their children read 31,000 books over 75-day reading challenge. [2] The GirlsRead! program in Zambia in 2019, found girls in the e-reader arm scored significantly better than girls in the control arm on two basic literacy assessments as well as on the non-verbal reasoning assessment [3]. In Peru, GRADE 2021 external evaluation found in Worldreader's pilot cohort of 470 children read 1,814 books, for a total of 16 books read per day (7 books per student, on average over the length of the project).[4]. The Worldreader  2 project was funded by an All Children Reading grant from USAID, World Vision and AusAid, aimed to improve early grade reading skills for students in Ghana. The project's final report, in November 2014, showed significant improvements in oral reading fluency, reading comprehension gains, significant impact among low-performing students and development of positive reading habits.

References

Educational charities based in the United States
International educational charities
Organizations promoting literacy
Dedicated ebook devices
Online nonprofit organizations
Non-profit organizations based in San Francisco
Organizations established in 2010
2010 establishments in the United States